The Mrs. Graham Fair Vanderbilt House is a mansion located at 60 East 93rd Street on the Upper East Side of Manhattan in New York City. It was added to the National Register of Historic Places on October 29, 1982.

The home was built in 1930 as a residence for Virginia Fair Vanderbilt, who was a daughter of James Graham Fair and the ex-wife of William Kissam Vanderbilt II. It was designed by John Russell Pope in the Classical Revival style.

The house served as a location for the Lycée Français de New York for many years until the school completed a new building around 2003. The mansion now serves as a gallery for Carlton Hobbs LLC, an antique dealer specializing in fine European furniture and works of art.

It is located beside the William Goadby Loew House at 56 East 93rd Street.

See also
National Register of Historic Places listings in Manhattan from 59th to 110th Streets
List of New York City Designated Landmarks in Manhattan from 59th to 110th Streets

References

Houses in Manhattan
Houses completed in 1930
Houses on the National Register of Historic Places in Manhattan
Neoclassical architecture in New York City
Upper East Side
New York City Designated Landmarks in Manhattan